The CK-12 Foundation is a California-based non-profit organization which aims to increase access to low-cost K-12 education in the United States and abroad.  CK-12 provides free and customizable K-12 open educational resources aligned to state curriculum standards. As of 2022, the foundation's tools were used by over 200,000,000 students worldwide.

CK-12 was set up to support K-12 Science, Technology, Engineering, and Math (STEM) education.  It first produced content via a web-based platform called "FlexBook."

History 

CK-12 was established in 2007 by Neeru Khosla and Murugan Pal as a not-for-profit educational organization. Teacher-generated content was initially made available under Creative Commons Attribution licenses so as to make it simpler, easier, and more affordable for children to access educational resources. However, they later switched to a Creative Commons Non Commercial licence, and then to their own "CK-12" license.

Originally, the "C" in CK-12 stood for "connect", indicating that the material was the missing connection in K-12 education.  Subsequently, it took on a more open meaning, variously standing for "content, classroom, customizable, connections, collaboration".

In 2010, NASA teamed up with CK-12 to produce physics-related resources.

In March 2013, Microsoft announced a partnership with CK-12 to provide content to Microsoft's Windows 8 customers.

FlexBook System 

The foundation's FlexBook website  permits the assembly and creation of downloadable educational resources which can be customized to meet classroom needs.  Some Flexbooks are even available in Spanish and Hindi. Content is offered under a Creative Commons licence, so removing many of the restrictions that limit distribution of traditional textbooks, and are available in various formats.

Approach 

The CK-12 Foundation's approach to supporting education in schools is by providing it as small, individual elements, rather than as large textbooks. As of 2012, some 5,000 individual elements were available in various formats such as textual descriptions, video lectures, multi-media simulations, photo galleries, practical experiments or flash cards.

Other products 

In addition to its 88 FlexBooks, the CK-12 Foundation also offers the following online resources to K-12 students:
 CK-12 Braingenie -a repository of math and science practice materials. 
 CK-12 FlexMath  - an interactive, year-long Algebra 1 curriculum.
 CK-12 INeedAPencil  - a free SAT preparation website, founded in 2007 by then high school student, Jason Shah.

Recognition 

 CK-12 has been listed in the Top 25 Websites for Teaching by American Association of School Librarians
 The National Tech Plan - The Office of Educational Technology, U.S. Department of Education – has mentioned the CK-12 model as “Transforming American Education – Learning Powered by Technology”
 Tech Awards-2010 listed CK-12 in “15 innovations that could save the world”
 In introducing Washington state bill, HB 2337: “Regarding open educational resources in K-12 education,” Representative Reuven Carlyle testifies to the benefit CK-12 materials can have for school districts around the country.
 Fortune Magazine described CK-12 as a threat to the traditional textbook industry, and wrote about CK-12's push towards concept-based learning.
 National Public Radio writes about CK-12, including its use of "Real World Applications" as teaching devices. 
 Neeru and CK-12 have been featured in the New York Times, the Gates Notes, Mercury News, TechCrunch, Education Week, EduKindle, The Patriot News, Getting Smart, and Teachinghistory.org

References

External links
 CK-12 Community Site.  
 O'Reilly Radar blog, Feb 12, 2008 : "Remix and Share Your Own Text Books as FlexBooks"
Flexmath website
General Student Learning website

Book publishing companies based in the San Francisco Bay Area
Textbook publishing companies
American educational websites
Publishing companies established in 2007
Educational organizations based in the United States
Non-profit organizations based in California